Power Thesaurus is a free online crowdsourced thesaurus.

History
Power Thesaurus  was created by Alexander Radyushin in 2012 and developed by Radyushin & Co.

The domain name for the thesaurus was registered on September 18, 2012.  In 2015, the android and iOS app versions of the thesaurus were developed while its Chrome and Opera browser extensions were released in 2016.

Content
The content of the thesaurus is user-editable and is also maintained by a team of full-time editors.

References

Thesauri (lexicography)
Internet properties established in 2012